Władysławin  is a village in the administrative district of Gmina Żółkiewka, within Krasnystaw County, Lublin Voivodeship, in eastern Poland.

On July 23, 1944, as revenge for the killing of an SS officer, the village of Władysławin, together with nearby Chłaniów, was burned down by the Ukrainian Self-Defense Legion. Overall, 44 residents died in the two villages.

References

Villages in Krasnystaw County